The Bundesstraße 303 (abbreviation: B 303) is a German federal highway that runs from west to east, beginning at the A 7 autobahn west of Schweinfurt and ending at the border with the Czech Republic east of Schirnding. It runs through the eastern part of Lower Franconia and the whole of Upper Franconia.

History 

The original route of Reichsstraße 303 ran from Schweinfurt via Schonungen, Hofheim in Unterfranken, Coburg, Mitwitz, Kronach and Selbitz to Hof and continued via Rehau and Eger to Mitterteich. In 1941 the section from Hof via Eger to Mitterteich was replaced by Reichsstraße 15 and the section of that from Hundsbach (border) to Mitterteich by the B 299. In the early 1950s the road from Marktrodach via Stadtsteinach, Bad Berneck, Marktredwitz and Arzberg to Schirnding was redefined as the Bundesstraße 303. This section used to be called the Main Valley Road (Maintalstraße).

The central section of the B 303 between Schonungen am Main and Tambach near Coburg originally ran through 14 villages. From the 1960s to the 1990s the route was re-routed eastwards in stages over a length of 49.7 km and, as a result, it now only passes through Oberelldorf and Tambach. Since 19 October 2007, the B 303 has crossed over junction 10 of the new A 73 autobahn (Nürnberg – Suhl) near Ebersdorf bei Coburg.

Fichtelgebirge autobahn 
There were plans to upgrade the section from Wirsberg to Cheb (Eger) into a four-lane 'yellow autobahn', the so-called 'Fichtelgebirge autobahn' (Fichtelgebirgsautobahn). This was intended to connected to the Czech highway, the D6 motorway, to Prague. However these plans were not put into action due to the expected environmental damage, high construction costs and decreasing traffic volumes since January 2009. Instead the existing B 303 will be selectively widened in places.

See also 
List of federal roads in Germany

External links 
 BI-B303 – Local initiative against heavy lorries on the B 303 
 Local initiative against the Fichtelgebirge autobahn

References
 http://www.reichsstrassen.de.vu

303